One in Five is a 1962 television play broadcast by the Australian Broadcasting Corporation. It was a ballet and was directed by Christopher Muir. It had been performed by the Australian ballet.

Dancers
Marilyn Jones
Ray Powell

References

External links

Australian television plays
Australian television plays based on ballets
Australian Broadcasting Corporation original programming
English-language television shows
1962 television plays